Jan Albert Venter (also Jasper Venter, born 23 April 1988 in Hartenbos, Western Cape) is a South African swimmer, who specialized in freestyle events. Venter won a bronze medal, as a member of the South African team, in the 4 × 200 metre freestyle relay at the 2010 Commonwealth Games in Delhi, India. He also helped his team to claim the title in the same relay distance at the 2011 All-Africa Games in Maputo, Mozambique, posting a meet record time of 7:33.63.

Venter qualified as a member of the South African team for the 4 × 200 metre freestyle relay at the 2008 Summer Olympics in Beijing, by placing third in the same distance from the national championships (1:50.60). Teaming with Sebastien Rousseau, Darian Townsend, and Jean Basson, Venter swam the third leg with a split of 1:49.56, but the South Africans rounded out the final field to last place in 7:13.02. Previously, they set an African standard of 7:10.91 from the preliminary heats.

At the 2009 FINA World Championships in Rome, Italy, Venter helped out his South African team (Basson, Rousseau, and Townsend) to dip under a 7:10 barrier, and broke a new record of 7:08.01 in the 4 × 200 m freestyle relay.

References

External links
NBC Olympics Profile

1988 births
Living people
People from Mossel Bay Local Municipality
White South African people
South African male swimmers
Olympic swimmers of South Africa
Swimmers at the 2008 Summer Olympics
South African male freestyle swimmers
Commonwealth Games bronze medallists for South Africa
Swimmers at the 2010 Commonwealth Games
Commonwealth Games medallists in swimming
African Games gold medalists for South Africa
African Games bronze medalists for South Africa
African Games medalists in swimming
Competitors at the 2011 All-Africa Games
21st-century South African people
20th-century South African people
Medallists at the 2010 Commonwealth Games